Vaughan is the given name of:

 Vaughan Arnell (born 1961), British music video director
 Vaughan Bowen (born 1972), Australian business executive
 Vaughan Brown (born 1959), New Zealand cricketer
 Vaughan Cornish (1862–1948), English geographer
 Vaughan Coveny (born 1971), New Zealand association footballer
 Vaughan Cox (1860–1923), British general in the Indian Army
 Vaughan Ellis (born 1947), Australian rules footballer
 Vaughan Gething (born 1974), Welsh politician
 Vaughan Glaser (1872–1958), American actor
 Vaughan Grayson (1894–1995), Canadian painter and writer
 Vaughan Grylls (born 1943), British conceptual artist and photographer
 Vaughan Harley (1864–1923), British professor
 Vaughan Johnson (1962–2019), American football player
 Vaughan Johnson (politician) (1947–2023), Australian politician
 Vaughan Jones (born 1952–2020), New Zealand mathematician
 Vaughan Jones (footballer) (born 1959), Welsh footballer
 Vaughan Kester (1869–1911), American novelist and journalist
 Vaughan King (born 1982), English singer-songwriter
 Vaughan Lee (fighter) (born 1982), English mixed martial artist
 Vaughan Lewis (born 1940), Saint Lucian politician
 Vaughan Lowe (born 1952), English judge and legal scholar
 Vaughan Oliver (1957–2019), British graphic designer
 Vaughan Pratt (born 1944), Australian-American computer scientist
 Vaughan Roberts (born 1965), English Anglican priest
 Vaughan Roderick (born 1957), Welsh television journalist
 Vaughan Russell (1890–1979), Scottish footballer
 Vaughan Ryan (born 1968), English footballer
 Vaughan Savidge (born 1956), British radio announcer and newsreader
 Vaughan Smith (born 1963), English war correspondent and restaurateur
 Vaughan Somers (born 1951), Australian golfer
 Vaughan Thomas (born 1945), English rugby league footballer 
 Vaughan Vaughan-Lee (1836–1882), English politician
 Vaughan Wilkins (1890–1959), English historical novelist

See also
 J. Vaughan Gary, American politician
 Ralph Vaughan Williams, English composer (note: given name is 'Ralph'; surname is 'Vaughan Williams')